Madison Iseman (born February 14, 1997) is an American actress. She is known for playing Charlotte in the CMT comedy television series Still the King, She is also known for playing Rain Burroughs in Fear of Rain, Bethany Walker in Jumanji: Welcome to the Jungle and Jumanji: The Next Level, Sarah Quinn in Goosebumps 2: Haunted Halloween, Lennon/Alison in I Know What You Did Last Summer,  and Mary Ellen in  Annabelle Comes Home.

Early life 
Iseman is from Myrtle Beach, South Carolina, and is the daughter of Susan and John Iseman, a dentist. She attended a virtual school.

Career 
Iseman went through four auditions over a period of several months for her role on Still The King. She has appeared in the series Modern Family and Henry Danger.

In 2017, Iseman became known for playing Bethany in Jumanji: Welcome to the Jungle. In the same year, she played Pam in Beauty Mark. She next had lead roles in two horror films, Goosebumps 2: Haunted Halloween, released in October 2018, and Annabelle Comes Home, released in June 2019. She also reprised her role as Bethany in the 2019 film Jumanji: The Next Level, the sequel to Jumanji: Welcome to the Jungle.

In April 2019, Iseman was cast in the lead role of Rain Burroughs in the film Fear of Rain, which premiered in February 2021. In January 2021, she was cast in the television series I Know What You Did Last Summer, part of the franchise of the same name, in which she played twins Allison and Lennon. The series was cancelled after one season in 2022. She will star alongside Mackenyu, Famke Janssen and Sean Bean in Knights of the Zodiac, the live-action film adaptation of the manga series Saint Seiya, which is set for release in 2023.

Personal life 
In 2012, Iseman went on a music/missions trip to Kenya for two weeks. As of August 2013, she was active with the First United Methodist Church while in Myrtle Beach. She owns a cat.

Filmography

Film

Television

References

External links

21st-century American actresses
Actresses from South Carolina
American child actresses
American film actresses
American people of Dutch descent
American people of Jewish descent
American television actresses
Living people
People from Myrtle Beach, South Carolina
1997 births